Gazi (also Romanized as Gazī and Gezzī; also known as Gīrī) is a village in Tabadkan Rural District, in the Central District of Mashhad County, Razavi Khorasan Province, Iran. At the 2006 census, its population was 190, in 37 families.

References 

Populated places in Mashhad County